Synaptus is a genus of beetles belonging to the family Elateridae.

The species of this genus are found in Europe.

Species:
 Synaptus filiformis (Fabricius, 1781)

References

Elateridae